John Winspear (18161874) was a ship builder in Hartlepool, England.

Life and career 
Born in Whitby in 1816 John Winspear set up his business in Hartlepool. Based in Middleton, Winspear's yard boasted a gridiron and patent slipway.

References 

People from Whitby
1816 births
1874 deaths
English shipbuilders